Philadelphia Freedom is the fourth  album to be released by Philadelphia International Records house-band MFSB. It is also noted as the debut of PIR producer, artist and musician Dexter Wansel.
Of the songs on this album, the bassline of the song "Smile Happy" was used in the song "It Wasn't Me" by Shaggy.

Track listing
"Zach's Fanfare #2"   	 1:03   	
"Get Down with The Philly Sound" (Roland Chambers)  4:29
"Philadelphia Freedom" (Elton John, Bernie Taupin)  6:00
"South Philly" (Kenneth Gamble, Leon Huff)  4:28
"Ferry Avenue" (Gene McFadden, John Whitehead, Leon Huff, Victor Carstarphen)  4:01 	
"Interlude 1"  0:52
"When Your Love Is Gone" (Dexter Wansel)  4:11
"Morning Tears" (Dexter Wansel)  5:15 
"Brothers and Sisters" (Bobby Martin, Kenneth Gamble, Harold Johnson)  3:50
"Smile Happy" (War)  5:52
"The Zip" (Kenneth Gamble, Leon Huff)  3:51

Personnel
MFSB
Bobby Eli, Norman Harris, Reggie Lucas, Roland Chambers, T.J. Tindall - guitar
Anthony Jackson, Ron Baker - bass
Leon Huff, Lenny Pakula, Eddie Green, Harold "Ivory" Williams - keyboards
Earl Young, Karl Chambers, Norman Farrington - drums
Larry Washington - percussion
Vincent Montana, Jr. - vibraphone
John E. "Monster" Davis (tenor), Zach Zachery (alto), Tony Williams - saxophone
Don Renaldo and his Strings and Horns

Charts

Singles

References

External links
 

1975 albums
MFSB albums
Albums produced by Kenneth Gamble
Albums produced by Leon Huff
Albums produced by Bobby Martin
Albums arranged by Bobby Martin
Albums recorded at Sigma Sound Studios
Philadelphia International Records albums